Mangostin is a natural xanthonoid, a type of organic compound isolated from various parts of the mangosteen tree (Garcinia mangostana).  It is a yellow crystalline solid with a xanthone core structure. Mangostin and a variety of other xanthonoids from mangosteen have been investigated for biological properties including antioxidant, anti-bacterial, anti-inflammatory, and anticancer activities.

In animal studies, mangostin has been found to be a central nervous system depressant which causes sedation, decreased motor activity, and ptosis.

The rind of partially ripe mangosteen fruit yields mangostin and also the related compound β-mangostin. Researchers conducted the optimization steps in order to increase the yield of α-Mangostin extraction from the pericarp of the mangosteen and was able to achieve 9.2 g/kg DW.  The rind of fully ripe fruits contains the xanthonoids gartanin, 8-disoxygartanin and normangostin. A derivative of mangostin, mangostin-3,6-di-O-glucoside, is a central nervous system depressant and causes a rise in blood pressure.

References 

Xanthonoids
Dietary antioxidants